William Benjamin Miller Sr. (September 15, 1929 – March 14, 2022) was an American politician and businessman.

Miller worked in sales and sales management. He served as chairman of the Forsyth County Republican Party. In 2006, he served in the North Carolina Senate. Miller died from complications of pneumonia on March 14, 2022, at the age of 92.

References

1929 births
2022 deaths
Businesspeople from North Carolina
Republican Party North Carolina state senators
People from Forsyth County, North Carolina
Deaths from pneumonia in North Carolina